

Yareta or llareta (Azorella compacta, known historically as Azorella yareta, from yarita in the Quechua language) is a velvety, chartreuse cushion plant in the family Apiaceae which is native to South America.

Description
Yareta is an evergreen perennial with a low, mat-like shape and hemispherical growth form that grows to around 6 m (~20 ft) in diameter.  The self-fertile, pink or lavender flowers are hermaphroditic and are pollinated by insects.

The plant prefers sandy, well-drained soils. Yareta is well-adapted to high insolation rates typical of the Andes highlands and cannot grow in shade. The plant's leaves grow into an extremely compact, dense mat that reduces heat and water loss. This mat grows near the ground where air temperature is one or two degrees Celsius higher than the mean air temperature. This temperature difference is a result of the longwave radiation re-radiated by the soil surface, which is usually dark gray to black in the Puna.

Many yaretas are estimated to be over 3,000 years old. These oldest ones have been reported to grow as slowly as  1/18th inch (1.4 millimeters) per year. Its very slow growth makes the traditional practice of harvesting it for fuel highly unsustainable.

Gallery

References

External links

Azorella compacta pictures from Chile

Azorella
Flora of the Andes
Flora of Argentina
Flora of Bolivia
Flora of northern Chile
Flora of Peru